The 2018 Middle East Rally Championship was an international rally championship sanctioned by the FIA. The championship was contested over five events held in five Middle East countries from April to November. One event, the Cyprus Rally, is shared with the 2018 European Rally Championship.

Qatar's Nasser Al-Attiyah won his fourteenth MERC championship and his eighth consecutively. Al-Attiyah won the season opening Jordan Rally and later the Kuwait International Rally which was returning to the schedule after being left of the 2017 calendar. Al-Attiyah was also the leading MERC competitor to finish at the Cyprus Rally. Czech driver Vojtěch Štajf won the last event of the year in Qatar, held just two weeks after Kuwait. He was also second in Jordan and the second placed MERC driver in Cyprus. He was runner up in the championship. Kuwaiti driver Meshari Al-Thefiri was third in the championship finishing second in Kuwait and third in Jordan. Lebanese veteran Roger Feghali's one-off appearance at his home event saw him win the rally for the fourteenth time.

Event calendar and results

The 2018 MERC was as follows:

Championship standings
The 2018 MERC for Drivers points was as follows:

References

External links

Middle East Rally Championship
Middle East
Middle East Rally Championship